Golyam Sechko Cove is the 2.45 km wide cove indenting for 780 m the northwest coast of Nelson Island in the South Shetland Islands, Antarctica southwest of Sabin Point. The area was visited by early 19th century sealers.

The feature is named after the Bulgarian mythical figure Golyam (big) Sechko associated with winter and cold, in relation to working in the harsh Antarctic environment.

Location
British mapping of the area in 1968.

Maps
 Livingston Island to King George Island. Scale 1:200000. Admiralty Nautical Chart 1776. Taunton: UK Hydrographic Office, 1968
 South Shetland Islands. Scale 1:200000 topographic map No. 3373. DOS 610 - W 62 58. Tolworth, UK, 1968
 Antarctic Digital Database (ADD). Scale 1:250000 topographic map of Antarctica. Scientific Committee on Antarctic Research (SCAR). Since 1993, regularly upgraded and updated

Notes

References
 Bulgarian Antarctic Gazetteer. Antarctic Place-names Commission. (details in Bulgarian, basic data in English)

External links
 Golyam Sechko Cove. Adjusted Copernix satellite image

Coves of the South Shetland Islands
Bulgaria and the Antarctic